The Christian People's Party (PPC) is a center-right and conservative political party based on the principles of Christian democracy. It was founded in 1966 by a group of Peruvian Christian Democrat Party (Democracia Cristiana) dissidents, led by Luis Bedoya Reyes.

In 2000, its inscription was renewed, and it became part of National Unity, although not in a permanent basis.

Leaders of the party have included Mario Polar Ugarteche, Roberto Ramírez del Villar, Ernesto Alayza Grundy, Felipe Osterling Parodi, and Lourdes Flores Nano.

In 2021, after losing the presidential elections and failing to overcome the electoral threshold, the party is expected to lose its electoral registration.

Foundation 

The party was founded on December 18, 1966 by a group of members of the Democracia Cristiana party that defected by ideological motifs. While their former party supported a constitutional break to accelerate the reforms needed by the country, the founders of the PPC, led by Luis Bedoya Reyes still believed in the constitutional order. Thus they retired from Democracia Cristiana and founded the new party.

History of the PPC

Military dictatorship of Velasco 

In 1968, General Juan Velasco Alvarado staged a coup d'etat against President Fernando Belaúnde Terry, an ally of Luis Bedoya Reyes. The PPC did not support the military regime and was one of its most fierce opponents, along with the Partido Aprista Peruano (APRA). The latter was declared illegal.

Constituent Assembly of 1978 

In 1978, the government of General Francisco Morales-Bermúdez called for elections for a Constituent Assembly. The PPC attained the second place in the polls, after the APRA. Bedoya Reyes, widely preferred by the Assembly members to become its president, gave the position to the veteran APRA leader, Víctor Raúl Haya de la Torre.

General Elections of 1980 

Luis Bedoya Reyes ran as the PPC's candidate for president in the General Elections of 1980, with Ernesto Alayza and Roberto Ramírez del Villar as first vice-president and second vice-president. Despite Bedoya finishing in the third place, the PPC got six Senators elected, as well as 10 deputies.

During the elections, the PPC allied with the soon-to-be elected President Fernando Belaúnde Terry, from Acción Popular. The PPC-Accíon Popular coalition gave Belaúnde the majority in the Senate and in the Deputies Chamber. The coalition also designated four PPC members as Ministers, including its leader Bedoya Reyes and Felipe Osterling Parodi.

General Elections of 1985 

For the General Elections of 1985, the coalition with Acción Popular was finished, and thus, both parties presented separate candidates. Bedoya Reyes finished in third again, trailing behind Alfonso Barrantes Lingán and ahead of Javier Alva Orlandinj. During Alan García's government, the PPC criticised the heterodox economic model designed by the APRA.

The PPC had only a few members in both chambers. Its most important representatives were Felipe Osterling Parodi in the Senate of Peru and Javier Bedoya – son of the founder of the PPC – in the Chamber of Deputies. When Alan García sought to take control of private banking, Luis Bedoya Reyes and Lourdes Flores rallied in the streets against the proposal. They were joined in the manifestations by the famous Peruvian writer Mario Vargas Llosa. The movement did stop the government from passing the polemical Law.

General Elections of 1990 

In 1990, the PPC enters a liberal coalition with Acción Popular and Mario Vargas Llosa's Movimiento Libertad (Liberty Movement), forming the Frente Democrático (Democratic Front, FREDEMO), which launched Vargas Llosa as a candidate for the presidency. Although he wasn't elected, the coalition's participation in the Chamber of Deputies was a success: it got 25 representatives, attaining the majority, including Javier Bedoya, one of the most voted deputies nationwide.

Democratic Constituent Congress election of 1992 

The PPC held the presidency of the Senate under Felipe Osterling Parodi's leadership when, in 1992, Alberto Fujimori staged a self-coup, dissolving both Chambers of the Congress, neutralising the FREDEMO and the APRA.

Fujimori held polls to elect a Democratic Constituent Congress, where his party, Cambio 90-Nueva Mayoría, got an absolute majority. The PPC was divided between those who wanted to be part of the elections and those who did not want to. Amongst those who did not want to participate where Natale Amprimo, Alberto Borea and Alberto Andrade, arguing that the PPC should not be part of a non-democratic process. In the other hand, Luis Bedoya Reyes, Lourdes Flores and Xavier Barrón contended that the PPC should present itself to guarantee democracy in the Constituent Congress. The decision of being part of the elections led to the resignations of Amprimo, Borea and Andrade. The PPC was the second most-voted party, but it was far behind of Cambio 90-Nueva Mayoría.

General Elections of 1995 and 2000 

In the General Elections of 1995, the PPC nominated Lourdes Flores as its candidate for president, but in the end she resigned to support Javier Pérez de Cuéllar's candidacy. Fujimori won without a run-off and the PPC only got the seventh place in the elections for Congressmen and 3 out of 120.

When Alberto Fujimori wanted to run for a third period in the General Elections of 2000, he was strongly opposed by the PPC. Congressmen Xavier Barrón, Ántero Flores Aráoz and Lourdes Flores proposed a law project that gave way to a referendum, where the people could decide whether Fujimori could participate in the elections. The Congress, controlled by Cambio 90-Nueva Mayoría did not let the Law pass. After the proposal of the law, the National Jury of Elections withdrew the PPC's inscription as a party, so it could not present candidates for the Congress. Because of that, Alejandro Toledo's Perú Posible party decided to support the PPC, including Xavier Barrón and Antero Flores Aráoz, as guests in its list for the Congress. Both of them were elected to Congress.

General Elections of 2001 and 2006 

In 2001, during the interim government of Acción Popular's Valentín Paniagua, the PPC recouped its inscription. It became part of a political coalition with Renovación Nacional and Cambio Radical, named Unidad Nacional (National Unity). The alliance's candidate for president was Lourdes Flores, who placed third by a narrow margin.

In 2006, the Unidad Nacional coalition continued, maintaining Lourdes Flores as its candidate. She did not pass to the round-off, again by a narrow margin, and again trailing behind Alan García, who would become President for a second time.

2007 to 2010 
In 2007, Ántero Flores Aráoz, the former president of the party, said in a disgraceful way that he would like to run for the Presidency of the Republic, as long as his party accredits it. He was accused of having a little brotherly and loyal behavior with the leader and members of the party, so he finally resigned from the PPC. Soon after, he was appointed permanent ambassador of Peru to the OAS. Lourdes Flores ran for mayor of Lima in the municipal elections of Lima in 2010, being defeated by Susana Villarán.

General Elections of 2011 
In 2010, they formed the Alliance for the Great Change, launching Pedro Pablo Kuczynski to the presidency in the general elections of Peru in 2011. This alliance won 12 of the 130 seats in the Congress of the Republic, 7 of which belong to the PPC .

In November 2011, Raúl Castro Stagnaro was elected as the new party president, replacing Lourdes Flores.

2013 to 2014 
The PPC decided to support the Metropolitan Council of Lima in the popular consultation process for the revocation of March 2013, getting Mayor Susana Villarán to commit to fulfilling an agenda for Lima. The councilors of the mayor's party were revoked, but those of the PPC were supported by the citizens. In November of the same year, the PPC achieved victory in the new municipal elections, held to replace the accessories who had entered after the March process. Thus, since January 2014, the PPC is the first minority of the Metropolitan Council.

In 2014, the PPC bases elected the former mayor of Villa El Salvador, Jaime Zea as a Candidate for Mayor of Lima. The result of the electoral process was one of the worst defeats of the party, barely obtaining 7 district mayoralties in Lima and its candidate 3% of the votes, remaining in 6th place.

General elections of 2016 
In 2016, they formed a political coalition with APRA called the Popular Alliance, after not obtaining any seats in congress, the political alliance was dissolved. That is why it does not have representation in congress for the period 2016-2021, the Partido Popular Cristiano party is in crisis. In this same year, the party premises are for sale valued at US $2,000,000.00.

Post-2016 elections 
The PPC militants, according to the party's Statute, convened a National Congress for December 16 and 17, 2017, in order to be able to elect a new national leadership due to the absence of authorities since 2016. Former Congressman Alberto Beingolea was elected in this process, defeating fellow former Congressman Javier Bedoya de Vivanco.

2021 general elections 
For the 2021 general election, Alberto Beingolea announced the establishment of National Unity, a party leadership roundtable of the Christian People's Party to analyze options if running in a coalition or independently in the elections. The roundtable managed to negotiate with a variety of political personalities and parties until reaching an agreement César Acuña of Alliance for Progress. The alliance was officially signed on 12 October 2020, but lasted only six days, upon the revelation of disconformity from PPC's leadership, most prominently from the party Secretary General, Marisol Pérez Tello, who rejected Acuña by stating "she would not support a plagiarizer". Illegal audios were revealed by the press, and the alliance broke off almost immediately.

Following the failed agreement with Alliance for Progress, Beingolea announced that he would run for the party's presidential nomination. He formally attained the nomination on 29 November 2020. On election day, Beingolea lost the election, placing 11th and the party failed to win any seats in the Congressional election and the party is expected to lose its electoral registration.

Election results

Presidential elections

Elections to the Congress of the Republic

Elections to the Senate

Elections to the Chamber of Deputies

References

External links

Christian People's Party webpage

1966 establishments in Peru
Catholic political parties
Christian democratic parties in South America
Conservative parties in Peru
International Democrat Union member parties
Political parties established in 1966
Political parties in Peru
Social conservative parties